The Lacquer Screen is a gong'an detective novel written by Robert van Gulik and set in Imperial China (the early decades of the Tang Dynasty). It is a fiction based on the real character of Judge Dee (Ti Jen-chieh or Di Renjie), a magistrate and statesman of the Tang court, who lived roughly 630–700 AD.

The book features fourteen illustrations by the author.

Plot introduction
In 663, Judge Dee is the young magistrate in the fictional Chinese town of Peng-lai. On a visit to a senior magistrate Teng in Wei-ping, he is shown a beautiful lacquer screen which is mysteriously altered to show a murder scene instead of a love scene. With the senior magistrate Teng convinced he is going insane, a wealthy banker in town appears to kill himself, though it might be murder. Judge Dee and his servant Chiao Tai disguise themselves to go undercover and join a gang of robbers to solve the case.

The town of Peng-lai was the setting for other Judge Dee stories including: The Chinese Gold Murders, and three of the short stories from Judge Dee at Work.

References

1962 novels
Gong'an novels
Judge Dee
Novels set in the 7th century
Novels set in the Tang dynasty